The Honor 8x is a smartphone made by Huawei under their Honor sub-brand. It is a successor of the Huawei Honor 7x within the Huawei Honor series.

Specifications

Display and Camera
The Honor 8X has a 6.5-inch FHD+ display with a screen resolution of 1,080 × 2,340 pixels, has a pixel density of 396 PPI, and has a 19.5:9 aspect ratio. The phone has 20 megapixel dual rear camera, a rear 2 megapixel LDAP depth sensor, and one front 16MP front camera.

One feature that is advertised is its "AI Photography", which attempts to improve images by adjusting colours and focus based on the type of scene.

Configuration and specifications
The base model Honor 8X has 64GB of internal storage, and 4GB of RAM. It can be purchased with up to 128GB of internal storage and 6GB of RAM. The internal storage can be expanded with a microSD card.

This device is powered by Huawei's HiSilicon Kirin 710 chipset with two quad-core Cortex A53 processors. The GPU is a Mali-T830 MP2.

It has a rear-mounted fingerprint scanner.

The Honor 8X uses a 3,750 mAh lithium polymer battery.

Connectivity
The phone supports 4G connectivity, and has two nano-sim slots. It supports Wi-Fi 802.11, Bluetooth 4.2, GPS, NFC, and has an FM radio receiver.

Charging is done via a micro-USB port. A bottom 3.5 mm audio jack supports wired headphones.

Software
The Honor 8x launched with Android (Oreo) and Huawei's EMUI 8.0, and can be upgraded to harmonyOS 3.0 with EMUI 10.0

References

Huawei Honor
Huawei mobile phones
Huawei products
Smartphones
Android (operating system)
Mobile phones with multiple rear cameras
Mobile phones introduced in 2018